Irvin W. Rybicki (September 16, 1921 - July 24, 2001) was an American car designer and vice president of General Motors Design on August 1, 1977, the third person to hold that position and did so until his retirement in October 1986.

Career
In February 1962, Rybicki became chief designer of the Chevrolet studio.  In September 1970, he was promoted to head of exterior design for Chevrolet, Pontiac and GMC.  Two years later, he was named executive in charge of design for Oldsmobile, Buick and Cadillac.  In 1977, he was promoted to vice president of design, taking over from Bill Mitchell.

Automobiles designed
 1973-1977 Chevrolet Monte Carlo
 1982-1994 Chevrolet Cavalier
 1983 General Motors Aero 2002 Concept Car
 1985-1990 Buick Electra
 1985-1990 Oldsmobile 98/Touring Sedan
 1985-1993 Cadillac DeVille
 1985-1993 Cadillac Fleetwood/Sixty Special
 1986-1991 Cadillac Seville
 1987-1991 Pontiac Bonneville
 1987-1996 Chevrolet Corsica

References

External links

1921 births
General Motors designers
American automobile designers
2001 deaths